Alexander Vladimirovich Solovtsov (14 November 1847, in Kazan – 20 March 1923, in Moscow) was a Russian chess master.

He tied for 3rd-4th and drew a match for the third place with Emanuel Schiffers (1:1) at Sankt Petersburg 1878/79. Solovtsov took part in the correspondence match between the Moscow and St. Petersburg chess clubs (January 1878 – March 1879), which ended with the score 2:0 in favor of the command of Moscow. He shared 1st at Moscow 1879, and won ahead of Hellwig, Muratov, and Maude at Moscow 1880.

He played several matches; drew with Mikhail Chigorin (1:1) in 1884, won against Raphael Falk (7:2) in 1892, and lost to Chigorin (0:4) in 1893. In 1894 he defeated Jacques Mieses, toured in Moscow. In 1899 he won the match with Boris Grigoriev and became the first champion of Moscow.

References

External links
 Chessgames.com – Alexander Solovtsov

1847 births
1923 deaths
Russian chess players
Sportspeople from Kazan